Winston Wole Soboyejo commonly known as "Wole" is an American Scientist of Yoruba Nigerian parentage. He is a materials scientist whose research focuses on biomaterials and the use of nanoparticles for the detection and treatment of disease, the mechanical properties of materials, and the use of materials science to promote global development. He is also the interim president at Worcester Polytechnic Institute.

Early life and education
Wole was born in Palo Alto, California, USA in 1964. He moved to Nigeria with his family in 1965. Wole is the son of Professor Alfred Sobojeyo of the Ohio State University  and Anthonia Soboyejo.
He was educated at King's College London (BS Mechanical Engineering, 1985) and Churchill College, Cambridge (PhD Materials Science and Metallurgy, 1988).

Career
Wole returned to the United States in 1988 to become a research scientist at The McDonnell Douglas Research Labs in St. Louis, MO.  
In 1992, he worked briefly as a Principal Research Engineer at the Edison Welding Institute before joining the engineering faculty of The Ohio State University in Columbus, OH. 
From 1997 to 1998, he was a Visiting Professor in the departments of mechanical engineering and materials science and engineering at Massachusetts Institute of Technology.
He served as a member of the Scientific Advisory Board of the Secretary General of the United Nations  from 2014 to 2016.
Dr. Soboyejo moved to Princeton University in 1999 where he served as a Professor of Mechanical and Aerospace Engineering and a Professor in the Princeton Institute of Science and Technology of Materials (PRISM).

He also served as the Director of the U.S./Africa Materials Institute (USAMI), one of six international materials institutes supported by the National Science Foundation, and the Director of the Materials Undergraduate Research Program  in PRISM.

Between 2012 and 2014, Soboyejo served as President and Provost of the African University of Science and Technology (AUST) in Abuja, Nigeria. AUST is a Pan-African university founded by the Nelson Mandela Institutions (NMI). Soboyejo has also served as the chair of the African Scientific Committee of the NMI.
In September 2016, Wole joined the faculty and administration at Worcester Polytechnic Institute (WPI) where he served as the Bernard M. Gordon Dean of Engineering and Professor of Engineering Leadership, prior to being named Senior Vice President and Provost.

His research focuses on materials for health, energy and the environment. His current projects include the use of nanomaterials for targeting and treating cancer; a shear assay technique that may be able to measure the mechanical properties of organelles in the cell; the development of low cost solar cells/light emitting devices; and sustainable approaches to providing clean water, affordable housing and education to people in the developing world.

In 2021, he was elected a member of the National Academy of Engineering for contributions to understanding dynamic behavior of materials and for leadership in STEM outreach in Africa.

References

Living people
Alumni of King's College London
Alumni of Churchill College, Cambridge
African-American scientists
American materials scientists
American people of Nigerian descent
American people of Yoruba descent
Princeton University faculty
Nigerian scientists
Yoruba scientists
American aerospace engineers
Yoruba engineers
Ohio State University faculty
Yoruba academics
African-American engineers
21st-century African-American people
1964 births
Fellows of the African Academy of Sciences